5 Metre is a development sailing class of French origin.

History
The 5 Metre rule was created in France in 1929 and not a according of the International rule in contrast to other Metre yachts.

See also
5.5 Metre

References

External links
 The Five – sporty open racer for a group of three

Keelboats
Development sailing classes